The ruby-crowned tanager (Tachyphonus coronatus) is a species of bird in the family Thraupidae found in the southern areas of Brazil and the Atlantic Forest.

Description 
The ruby-crowned tanager is a small bird, 16 centimeters or 6 inches long, weighing from 26 to 33 grams. Males are shining black with concealed red crests on the front of their head that they rarely raise, usually when excited, and white wingpits that are visible only when flying. Females are light brown, with slight black streaking under the throat and darker wings. Both sexes possess conical bills and black legs and feet.

Distribution and habitat 
Ruby-crowned tanagers have a large range, occupying most of southern Brazil, eastern Paraguay and the Misiones Province of Argentina. Its natural habitats are subtropical or tropical moist lowland forest, subtropical or tropical moist montane forest, and heavily degraded former forest.

Diet 
Ruby-crowned tanagers eat lots of fruit and insects, as well as seeds. They sometimes pursue swarms of army ants to find food, and will come to feeding stations with fruit.

Behavior 
Ruby-crowned tanagers live in pairs, but can also be seen in slightly larger flocks or alone. They are active, and will quickly move from one fruit tree to another in search of food.

References

ruby-crowned tanager
Birds of Brazil
Birds of the Atlantic Forest
ruby-crowned tanager
Taxa named by Louis Jean Pierre Vieillot
Taxonomy articles created by Polbot